Early voting or Early Voting may refer to:

 Early voting, a convenience voting process
 Early Voting, an American Thoroughbred racehorse